Cookin' with the Miracles is the second Tamla album by American soul vocal group The Miracles, and their second of 1961. Berry Gordy and Smokey Robinson co-wrote most of the songs, including the two charting singles "Ain't It Baby" (#49 US, #15 R&B) and "Everybody's Gotta Pay Some Dues" (#52 US, #11 R&B). Another single, "Mighty Good Lovin’" (#51 US, #21 R&B) b/w "Broken Hearted" (#97 US), was issued in between those two. However, only "Broken Hearted" appears on the album, featuring a different vocal take to the single version. The album is composed mostly of upbeat R&B tunes with steady string riffs, like "Determination" and "Broken Hearted". A cover of the jazz standard "Embraceable You" by George & Ira Gershwin is also included. "That's The Way I Feel", also from this album, was chosen for the soundtrack of the award-winning 1964 Ivan Dixon film Nothing But a Man.

Cookin' with the Miracles is one of only two Miracles albums to feature on its cover the complete original six-member group lineup: Smokey Robinson, Bobby Rogers, Claudette Rogers Robinson, Pete Moore, Ronnie White and Marv Tarplin.

Track listing

Side one
 "That's The Way I Feel" (Berry Gordy, Jr., Smokey Robinson) (2:38)
 "Everybody's Gotta Pay Some Dues" (Robinson, Ronald White) (2:55)
 "Mama" (Robinson, Janie Bradford, Gordy) (2:18)
 "Ain't It Baby" (Gordy, Robinson) (2:33)
 "Determination" (Robinson) (2:17)

Side two
 "You Never Miss A Good Thing" (Gordy, Robinson) (2:42)
 "Embraceable You" (George & Ira Gershwin) (2:49)
 "The Only One I Love" (Robinson) (2:34)
 "Broken Hearted" (Gordy, Robinson) (2:56)
 "I Can't Believe" (Robinson) (2:52)

1994 CD reissue bonus track
 "Mighty Good Lovin'" (Robinson) (2:37)

Personnel

The Miracles
 Smokey Robinson –  lead vocals (1st tenor/falsetto)
 Ronnie White –  background vocals (baritone)
 Bobby Rogers –  background vocals (2nd tenor)
 Warren "Pete" Moore –  background vocals (bass)
 Claudette Robinson –  background vocals (soprano)
 Marv Tarplin – guitar

Other credits
 Berry Gordy, Jr. – producer, executive producer
 The Funk Brothers – instrumentation

References

1961 albums
The Miracles albums
Tamla Records albums
Albums produced by Berry Gordy
Albums recorded at Hitsville U.S.A.